The 1999–2000 Canadian network television schedule indicates the fall prime time schedules for Canada's major English broadcast networks. For schedule changes after the fall launch, please consult each network's individual article.

1999 official fall schedule

Sunday

Monday

Tuesday

Wednesday

Thursday

Friday

Saturday

References

External links 

1999 in Canadian television
2000 in Canadian television
Canadian television schedules